Summer Jam may refer to:
 Summer Jam (festival), an annual hip-hop fest held in East Rutherford, New Jersey
 Summer Jam at Watkins Glen, a 1973 rock festival
 Summer Jam (The Underdog Project song)
 Summer Jam (R.I.O. song)
 Twin Cities Summer Jam

See also
 Summerjam, a European reggae festival